Bruno Saunier (born 19 July 1963) is a French ice hockey player. He competed in the men's tournaments at the 1992 Winter Olympics and the 1994 Winter Olympics.

References

1963 births
Living people
Olympic ice hockey players of France
Ice hockey players at the 1992 Winter Olympics
Ice hockey players at the 1994 Winter Olympics
People from Gap, Hautes-Alpes
Sportspeople from Hautes-Alpes